Sir Albert James Smith  (March 12, 1822 – June 30, 1883) was a New Brunswick politician and opponent of Canadian confederation. Smith's grandfather was a United Empire Loyalist who left Massachusetts to settle in New Brunswick after the American Revolution.

Smith entered politics in 1852 entering the House of Assembly as an opponent of the Tory compact that ran the colony and became a leading reform and advocate of responsible government which was granted to the colony in 1854. Smith became a member of the reform government that took power that year and went on to become Attorney-General in 1861 under Premier Samuel Leonard Tilley.  Smith split with Tilley over railway policy and Canadian confederation with Smith becoming leader of the Anti-Confederates winning the 1865 election but was forced from office the next year by the lieutenant-governor.
He was created a Queen's Counsel in 1862.

Smith reconciled with Confederation after it became a fact and became minister of fisheries in the Liberal government of Alexander Mackenzie in 1873. He died in 1883, and was interred in Dorchester Rural Cemetery.

Electoral record 

By-election: on Mr. Smith being appointed Minister of Marine and Fisheries:

|- 
  
|Liberal
| Albert James Smith
|align="right"| acclaimed

Further reading
 J. E. Belliveau, 1976, The Splendid Life of Albert Smith and the Women he Left Behind, Windsor, NS: Lancelot Press

References
 
 

1822 births
1883 deaths
Canadian Knights Commander of the Order of St Michael and St George
Lawyers in New Brunswick
Canadian King's Counsel
Liberal Party of Canada MPs
Members of the House of Commons of Canada from New Brunswick
Members of the King's Privy Council for Canada
Premiers of New Brunswick
Persons of National Historic Significance (Canada)
People from Shediac
Attorneys General of the Colony of New Brunswick
Colony of New Brunswick people